Aphidoletes aphidimyza, commonly referred to as the aphid midge, is a midge whose larvae feed on over 70 aphid species, including the green peach aphid.

Description 
They hide beneath the leaves during the day, and are active at night.

Life cycle 
Females deposit 100-250 tiny shiny orange eggs singly or in small groups among aphid colonies that hatch in 2–3 days. After 3–7 days the larvae drop to the ground and burrow  inches into the soil to pupate.

Behavior 
The small, bright orange, slug-like larvae inject a toxin into aphids' leg joints to paralyze them and then suck out the aphid body contents through a hole bitten in the thorax. Larvae can consume aphids much larger than themselves and may kill many more aphids than they eat when aphid populations are high.

Use in biological pest control 
The aphid midge is commercially grown by insectaries for use as biological pest control in commercial greenhouse crops. It is supplied as pupae in trays or bottles containing a moist substrate such as vermiculite or peat moss for the pupae to complete their development. Once they are placed in the greenhouse they usually emerge from the shipping container as adults to begin egg-laying in 3–7 days depending on temperature.

External links 
Images representing  Cecidomyiidae at BOLD
Aphidoletes aphidimyza. Bugguide.net
Aphidoletes aphidimyza. Cornell University
Oviposition behavior of the biological control agent Aphidoletes aphidimyza. USDA

Cecidomyiinae
Insects used as insect pest control agents
Insects described in 1847
Taxa named by Camillo Rondani